The Best Australian Poetry 2007 is an anthology of poetry published by  UQP in 2007.  The series editors are Bronwyn Lea and Martin Duwell; the guest editor for the 2007 anthology was John Tranter.

The selected poems were drawn from the following Australian literary magazines: The Australian Book Review, Blast magazine, Blue Dog, Famous Reporter, Going Down Swinging, Heat, Hecate, Meanjin, Southerly, Space: New Writing, and the Weekend Australian.

The 40 contributors are: 

 Robert Adamson
 Judith Bishop
 Pam Brown
 Joanne Burns
 Grant Caldwell
 Chris Edwards
 Michael Farrell
 Barbara Fisher
 Dennis Foley
 Alison Gerber

 Jennifer Harrison
 Dominique Hecq
 Matt Hetherington
 Charles Higham
 Clive James
 Mary Jenkins
 Jill Jones
 S. K. Kelen
 Cath Kenneally
 John Kinsella

 Cameron Lowe
 David McCooey
 Jennifer Maiden
 Graeme Miles
 John Millett
 Pooja Mittal
 Reg Mombassa
 Les Murray
 Louise Nicholas
 Ouyang Yu

 Geoff Page
 Megan Petrie
 Craig Powell
 Michael Riley
 Peter Rose
 Brendan Ryan
 Tracy Ryan
 Michael Sharkey
 Chris Wallace-Crabbe
 Dennis Wild

See also
 2007 in poetry
 Best American Poetry series
 Best New Zealand Poems series

2007 poetry books
2007 anthologies
Australian poetry anthologies
University of Queensland Press books